Events from the year 1906 in the United Kingdom.

Incumbents
 Monarch – Edward VII
 Prime Minister – Henry Campbell-Bannerman (Liberal)
 Parliament
 27th (until 8 January)
 28th (starting 13 February)

Events

 8 February – the Liberal Party led by Henry Campbell-Bannerman win the general election with a large majority.
 10 February – , the first all-big-gun battleship, is launched at Portsmouth and sparks the naval race between Britain and Germany.
 15 February – representatives of the Labour Representation Committee in Parliament take the name Parliamentary Labour Party.
 10 March – Bakerloo line of the London Underground opened.
 15 March – Rolls-Royce Limited is registered as a car manufacturer.
 22 March – first international rugby match. England defeats France 25–8.
 21 April – Manchester United F.C., known as Newton Heath until four years ago, secure promotion to the Football League First Division.
 15 May – Our Dumb Friends League opens its first animal hospital, in Victoria, London.
 26 May – opening of Vauxhall Bridge in London.
 30 May – Royal Navy battleship HMS Montagu runs aground on the island of Lundy and becomes a loss.
 22 June – the present King's daughter Maud is crowned as queen consort of Norway.
 27 June – Swansea earthquake causes considerable damage.
 30 June – Salisbury rail crash: a London and South Western Railway express train suffers derailment and collision passing through Salisbury station at excessive speed; 24 passengers and 4 railwaymen are killed.
 12 July – Handcross Hill bus crash: 10 people are killed when a Vanguard Milnes-Daimler bus crashes on Handcross Hill whilst on a private hire excursion to Brighton.
 31 August–3 September – Heat wave reaches its peak.
 15 September – anti-vivisection Brown Dog statue is erected in Battersea, provoking riots.
 19 September – Grantham rail accident: a Great Northern Railway sleeping car train suffers derailment passing through Grantham station at excessive speed; 14 are killed.
 30 September – the first Gordon Bennett Cup in ballooning is held, starting in Paris; the winners, in the balloon United States, land in Fylingdales, Yorkshire.
 October – new City Hall, Cardiff, opens in Cathays Park.
 8 October – German inventor and hairdresser Karl Nessler gives the first public demonstration of his permanent wave machine in London.
 23 October – suffragettes disrupt the State Opening of Parliament.
 2 December – HMS Dreadnought commissioned.
 10 December – J. J. Thomson wins the Nobel Prize in Physics "in recognition of the great merits of his theoretical and experimental investigations on the conduction of electricity by gases."
 13 December
 Trade Disputes Act legalises picketing.
 Workmen's Compensation Act entitles workers to compensation for industrial injuries or disease.
 15 December – Piccadilly line of the London Underground opened.
 21 December – Education (Provision of Meals) Act allows local education authorities to provide cheap or free school meals to the poorest children.

Undated
 Hampstead Garden Suburb established in north London.
 Richard Oldham argues that the Earth has a molten interior.
 Alice Perry becomes the first woman to graduate with a degree in civil engineering in the British Isles, at Queen's College, Galway, Ireland, and is appointed in December as an acting county surveyor.
 J. K. Farnell of London manufacture the first British teddy bear.

Publications
 Angela Brazil's schoolgirl story The Fortunes of Philippa.
 William De Morgan's novel Joseph Vance.
 The English Hymnal edited by Percy Dearmer and Ralph Vaughan Williams.
 Henry Watson Fowler and Frank Fowler's book The King's English.
 John Galsworthy's first Forsyte Saga novel The Man of Property.
 Rudyard Kipling's historical fantasy Puck of Pook's Hill.
 William Le Queux and H. W. Wilson's invasion literature novel The Invasion of 1910 (originally serialised in the Daily Mail from 19 March).
 E. Nesbit's novel The Railway Children (in book form).
 J. M. Dent and Company commence publication of the Everyman's Library series with Boswell's Life of Johnson.

Births
 12 January – Eric Birley, historian and archaeologist (died 1995)
 16 January – Diana Wynyard, actress (died 1964)
 19 January – Leader Stirling, missionary surgeon (died 2003)
 22 January – Joe Gladwin, actor (died 1987)
 23 January – Lady May Abel Smith, royalty, great-granddaughter of Queen Victoria (died 1994) 
 10 February – Arthur Elton, pioneer documentary film maker (died 1973)
 13 February  – E. M. Wright, mathematician (died 2005)
 19 February – Grace Williams, Welsh composer (died 1977)
 26 February – Madeleine Carroll, actress (died 1997)
 28 February – Percy Shakespeare, painter (died 1943)
 3 March – Rose Hacker, activist (died 2008)
 13 March – Dave Kaye, pianist (died 1996)
 16 March – Henny Youngman, American-domiciled comedian (died 1998)
 19 March – Stella Ross-Craig, floral illustrator (died 2006)
 25 March – A. J. P. Taylor, historian (died 1990)
 26 March – Ronald Urquhart, general (died 1968)
 31 March – David Heneker, composer (died 2001)
 8 April – Marjorie Lewty, writer (died 2002)
 9 April – Hugh Gaitskell, Labour politician (died 1963)
 11 April – Julia Clements, flower arranger (died 2010)
 18 April – George Wallace, politician (died 2003)
 21 April
 Lillian Browse, art dealer (died 2005)
 Stephen Tennant, eccentric socialite (died 1987)
 29 May – T. H. White, Indian-born novelist (died 1964)
 1 June – Walter Legge, classical record producer (died 1979)
 5 June – Margaret Sampson, Anglican nun (died 1988)
 19 June – Ernst Boris Chain, German-born biochemist, Nobel laureate (died 1979)
 20 June – Robert Trent Jones, American-domiciled golf course designer (died 2000)
 27 June
 Catherine Cookson, novelist (died 1998)
 Vernon Watkins, Welsh poet (died 1967)
 30 June – Ralph Allen, footballer (died 1981)
 1 July
 Ritchie Calder, Scottish socialist author, journalist and academic (died 1982)
 Ivan Neill, major and Irish Unionist politician (died 2001)
 3 July – George Sanders, screen actor (died 1972)
 10 July – Harold Ridley, ophthalmologist (died 2001)
 5 August – Joan Hickson, actress (died 1998)
 7 August – Launcelot Fleming, Anglican bishop and polar explorer (died 1990)
 28 August – John Betjeman, poet laureate (died 1984)
 30 August – Elizabeth Longford, biographer (died 2002)
 1 September – Eleanor Hibbert, historical romantic novelist under several pseudonyms (died 1993)
 16 September – Norman Lumsden, opera singer (died 2001)
 27 September – William Empson, poet and literary critic (died 1984)
 30 September – J. I. M. Stewart, Scottish-born novelist and academic critic (died 1994)
 20 October – Winifred Watson, novelist (died 2002)
 21 October – Elsie Widdowson, dietician and nutritionist (died 2000)
 24 October – Robert Sainsbury, businessman and art collector (died 2000)
 1 November – Beryl Cooke, actress (died 2001)
 4 November – Arnold Cooke, composer (died 2005)
 5 November – "Pip" Roberts, general (died 1997)
 6 November – Alastair Graham, zoologist (died 2000)
 13 November
 Hermione Baddeley, character actress (died 1986)
 John Sparrow, literary scholar (died 1992)
 18 November
 Neville Ford, cricketer (died 2000) 
 Alec Issigonis, Ottoman-born car designer (died 1988)
 19 November – Alan Bloom, horticulturalist (died 2005)
 21 November – Georgina Battiscombe, biographer (died 2006)
 29 November – Barbara C. Freeman, writer and poet (died 1999)
 8 December – Richard Llewellyn, novelist (died 1983)
 24 December – James Hadley Chase, novelist (died 1985)
 30 December – Carol Reed, film director (died 1976)

Deaths
 5 January – Sir William Gatacre, general (born 1843)
 22 January – George Holyoake, secularist and proponent of the cooperative movement (born 1817)
 1 February – J. P. Seddon, architect and designer (born 1827)
 2 March – Ellen Mary Clerke, writer (born 1840)
 8 March – Henry Baker Tristram, ornithologist and clergyman (born 1822)
 19 April – Spencer Gore, tennis player and cricketer (born 1850)
 5 May – Eliza Brightwen, naturalist (born 1830)
 6 June – Sir Frederick Peel, politician (born 1823)
 20 June – John Clayton Adams, landscape painter (born 1840)
 3 August – Sir Sydney Waterlow, businessman, politician and philanthropist (born 1822)
 19 August – Agnes Catherine Maitland, academic, novelist and cookery writer (born 1850)
 24 September – Charlotte Riddell, fiction writer and editor (born 1832)
 9 October – Wilhelmina FitzClarence, Countess of Munster, fiction writer (born 1830)
 30 October – Gathorne Gathorne-Hardy, 1st Earl of Cranbrook, politician (born 1814)
 9 November – Dorothea Beale, proponent of women's education (born 1831)
 30 November – Sir Edward Reed, naval architect, politician and Florida railroad magnate (born 1830)
 19 December – Frederic William Maitland, historian and jurist (born 1850)
 30 December
 Angela Burdett-Coutts, 1st Baroness Burdett-Coutts, philanthropist (born 1814)
 Josephine Butler, feminist and social reformer (born 1828)
 Eugène Goossens, père, conductor (born 1845 in Belgium)

See also
 List of British films before 1920

References

 
Years of the 20th century in the United Kingdom